Sutherlin is a city in Douglas County, Oregon, United States. As of the 2010 Census, the population was 7,810, making it the second most populous city in Douglas County. Located off of I-5, nearby features include Cooper Creek Reservoir, Ford's pond (treated waste water), the Umpqua River, a golf course, and numerous vineyards.

The City of Sutherlin Police Department also serves the City of Oakland via a paid contract.

Geography and climate
Sutherlin is located at  (43.388435, -123.316175).

Sutherlin has the typical western Oregon Mediterranean climate (Köppen Csb) characterized by dry summers featuring cool mornings and hot afternoons, and chilly, wet winters.

Demographics

2010 census
As of the census of 2010, there were 7,810 people, 3,249 households, and 2,178 families living in the city. The racial makeup of the city was 92.4% White, 0.2% African American, 1.9% Native American, 0.6% Asian, 0.1% Pacific Islander, 1.8% from other races, and 2.9% from two or more races. Hispanic or Latino of any race were 6.1% of the population.

There were 3,249 households, of which 27.3% had children under the age of 18 living with them, 51.6% were married couples living together, 11.4% had a female householder with no husband present, 4.1% had a male householder with no wife present, and 33.0% were non-families. 27.3% of all households were made up of individuals, and 14.8% had someone living alone who was 65 years of age or older. The average household size was 2.37 and the average family size was 2.86.

The median age in the city was 44.8 years. 22.4% of residents were under the age of 18; 6.6% were between the ages of 18 and 24; 21.2% were from 25 to 44; 25.7% were from 45 to 64; and 24% were 65 years of age or older. The gender makeup of the city was 47.6% male and 52.4% female.

2000 census
As of the census of 2000, there were 6,669 people, 2,713 households, and 1,909 families living in the city. The population density was 1,283.2 people per square mile (495.2/km). There were 2,975 housing units at an average density of 572.4 per square mile (220.9/km). The racial makeup of the city was 93.79% White, 0.13% African American, 1.72% Native American, 0.51% Asian, 0.06% Pacific Islander, 1.09% from other races, and 2.68% from two or more races. Hispanic or Latino of any race were 3.97% of the population.

There were 2,713 households, out of which 30.0% had children under the age of 18 living with them, 56.7% were married couples living together, 9.8% had a female householder with no husband present, and 29.6% were non-families. 24.5% of all households were made up of individuals, and 14.5% had someone living alone who was 65 years of age or older. The average household size was 2.46 and the average family size was 2.88.

In the city, the population was spread out, with 25.0% under the age of 18, 6.7% from 18 to 24, 24.9% from 25 to 44, 22.0% from 45 to 64, and 21.3% who were 65 years of age or older. The median age was 40 years. For every 100 females, there were 91.5 males. For every 100 females age 18 and over, there were 86.9 males.

The median income for a household in the city was $29,068, and the median income for a family was $34,414. Males had a median income of $32,047 versus $20,911 for females. The per capita income for the city was $13,439. About 12.4% of families and 14.9% of the population were below the poverty line, including 16.5% of those under age 18 and 9.1% of those age 65 or over.

References

Further reading

 G.H. Lee, A History of Sutherlin, Oregon. Sutherlin, OR: Umpqua Print and Copy Center, 1988.

External links

 Entry for Sutherlin in the Oregon Blue Book

Cities in Oregon
Cities in Douglas County, Oregon
1911 establishments in Oregon